Nepotilla triseriata is a species of sea snail, a marine gastropod mollusk in the family Raphitomidae.

Description
The length of the shell attains 4.6 mm, its diameter 2.4 mm.

(Original description) The shell consists of 6 whorls, including the protoconch of 2 whorls, with an exsert apex, closely spirally lirate. When viewed from the apex, the contour of the spire whorls is not uniformly curved, but polygonal, septangulate in the type. They have a central angulation, provided with a stout, rounded cord, and are constricted at the linear sutures. In the first and second spire-whorls a smaller secondary lira arises above the angle and another below. In the third whorl another tertiary and still smaller lira is intercalated above, and another in each interval below. In the body whorl, below these, arising at the suture is a stout cord forming a second angulation, below which the base is markedly concavely onstricted, 
and has about ten lirae, diminishing in size anteriorly. The aperture is obliquely oval, narrowed behind. The columella is straightly convex. The outer lip thin, simple, crenulated, and toothed by the spirals. With a deep, narrow posterior sinus, bounded on one side by the sutural lira, and on the other by the nearest secondary lira. In profile the lip is convex. Very fine crowded axial striae, corresponding with the sinuosity of the outer lip, cross the whole surface except the primary spirals.

Distribution
This marine species is endemic to Australia and occurs of Victoria, South Australia and Tasmania

References

 May, W.L. 1923. An illustrated index of Tasmanian shells: with 47 plates and 1052 species. Hobart : Government Printer 100 pp.* Powell, A.W.B. 1966. The molluscan families Speightiidae and Turridae, an evaluation of the valid taxa, both Recent and fossil, with list of characteristic species. Bulletin of the Auckland Institute and Museum. Auckland, New Zealand 5: 1–184, pls 1–23

External links
  Hedley, C. 1922. A revision of the Australian Turridae. Records of the Australian Museum 13(6): 213-359, pls 42-56 
 
 Grove, S.J. (2018). A Guide to the Seashells and other Marine Molluscs of Tasmania: Nepotilla triseriata

triseriata
Gastropods described in 1909
 Gastropods of Australia